Zhou Yang (born 6 June 1985) is a Chinese actress.

Zhou is noted for her roles as Ouyang He and Sophia in the television series Special Mission (2006) and Love You You (2011) respectively.

Zhou has won the Golden Phoenix Award for New Performer, Huading Award for Best Actress and Outstanding Actress Award at the Chinese American Film Festival, and received Golden Eagle Award nomination for Favorite Actress.

Early life
Zhou was born and raised in Dalian, Liaoning. In 1999, Zhou attended the National Dance Competition and finished in second place.

Zhou graduated from Beijing Film Academy, where she studied alongside Liu Yifei, Jiang Yiyan and Zhu Yawen.

Acting career
Zhou made her acting debut in Dancing with the Sunlight, playing Wu Qian.

In 2005, Zhou co-starred with Chen Baoguo and Li Guangjie in the King Goujian of Yue as Xi Shi, who was one of the renowned Four Beauties of ancient China.

In 2006, Zhou won the New Performer Award at the Golden Phoenix Awards for her performance in Special Mission, and was nominated for Favorite Actress Award at the Golden Eagle Awards.

In 2007, Zhou starred in the historical romantic comedy television series Prelude of Lotus Lantern, alongside Liu Xiaoqing and Vincent Chiao.

Zhou played the role of Hong Ying in Sword in the Sky (2008), for which she won the Best Actress Award at the Huading Awards. That same year, she had a cameo appearance in Fit Lover, a romantic comedy film starring Karena Lam, Alec Su, and Huang Xiaoming.

In 2010, Zhou participated in Legend of the Fist: The Return of Chen Zhen, a Hong Kong action film starring Donnie Yen, Shu Qi, and Anthony Wong.

In 2011, for her role as Sophia in Love You You, Zhou won the Outstanding Actress Award at the Chinese American Film Festival.

In 2013, Zhou starred in a historical television series called Zhou Kuangyin with Chen Jianbin, Yin Tao, and Shao Feng.

Personal life
In 2017, Zhou was married to Singaporean financial businessman Chen Zhenghong.

Filmography

Film

Television

Awards

References

External links

1985 births
Actresses from Dalian
Living people
Actresses from Liaoning
Beijing Film Academy alumni
Chinese film actresses
Chinese television actresses